Geovanna is a feminine given name.

People known by this name include:

 Geovanna Bañuelos de la Torre (born 1980), Mexican politician
 Geovanna Santos (born 2002), Brazilian rhythmic gymnast
 Geovanna Tominaga (born 1980), Brazilian actress and television host

See also 

 Giovanna

Given names
Feminine given names